Thomas Thornbury (born  March 17, 1963) is a Canadian former professional ice hockey player who played 14 games in the National Hockey League for the Pittsburgh Penguins.

Thornbury was born in Lindsay, Ontario.

Career statistics

External links

1963 births
Living people
Canadian ice hockey defencemen
Sportspeople from Kawartha Lakes
Baltimore Skipjacks players
Cornwall Royals (OHL) players
Frankfurt Lions players
Fredericton Express players
Grizzlys Wolfsburg players
Kölner Haie players
Moncton Golden Flames players
Muskegon Lumberjacks players
Niagara Falls Flyers players
North Bay Centennials players
Oklahoma City Blazers (1992–2009) players
Pittsburgh Penguins players